Baykov, Baikov or Baikoff is a Russian masculine surname, its feminine counterpart is Baykova or Baikova. It may refer to
Alexander Baykov (1870-1946), Russian scientist
Andrey Baykov (born 1984), Russian scholar in international relations 
Evgenia Baykova (1907–1997), Russian painter
 Fyodor Baykov (c. 1612–1663), the first Russian envoy to China
Leonid Baykov (1919–1994), Russian painter
Vadim Baykov (born 1965), Russian composer
 Viktor Baykov (born 1935), Soviet marathon runner

Russian-language surnames